Pappus may refer to:

 Pappus (botany), a structure within certain flowers
 Pappus (bug), a genus of insects in the tribe Mirini
 Pappus of Alexandria, Greek mathematician
 Pappus's hexagon theorem, often just called 'Pappus's theorem', a theorem named for Pappus of Alexandria
 Pappus's centroid theorem, another theorem named for Pappus of Alexandria
 Pappus configuration, a geometric configuration related to 'Pappus's theorem'
 Pappus graph, a graph related to the pappus configuration

See also
 Papus (disambiguation)